KLLV (550 AM) is a radio station broadcasting a Christian radio format. Licensed to Breen, Colorado, United States, the station serves the Four Corners area. The station is currently owned by Daystar Radio, Ltd.

History
The station was assigned the KLLV call letters on May 2, 1983.

References

External links

LLV
Radio stations established in 1983
LLV
1983 establishments in Colorado